Squeeze the Trigger is a 1997 album by Alec Empire, his second for his own Digital Hardcore Recordings label. It compiles tracks from out-of-print singles issued on the Riot Beats label, many of which were originally attributed to various pseudonyms. Releases tracks are taken from include Squeeze the Trigger, The Destroyer and The King Of The Street Feat. Brothers Crush.

Track listing
"Squeeze the Trigger" - 6:15
"Silver Pills" - 6:36
"Fuck the Shit Up" - 3:29
"Streets of Gold" - 6:35
"The King of the Street" - 5:22
"The Brothers Crush" - 6:38
"The Drum and the Bass" - 5:18
"Generate" - 4:53
"Euphoric" - 5:42
"The Destroyer" - 5:53
"Burn Babylon Burn" - 3:35
"Destruction" - 4:54
"I Am You (Identity)" - 5:22

Bonus CD
A bonus CD was included with Beat Records' release of the album in Japan.
"Hectic"
"L.E.A."
"In between Two Girls"
"Rise of the Lion"
"I Want Action" (Demo Version)

External links
Squeeze the Trigger CD at Discogs
Squeeze the Trigger LP at Discogs
Squeeze the Trigger Beat Records CD at Discogs
Official Digital Hardcore Recordings site

Alec Empire albums
1997 compilation albums